This is a list of cricket grounds in South Africa. The list includes all grounds that have been used for Test, One Day International, Twenty20 International, first-class, List A and Twenty20 cricket matches. Grounds that have hosted men's international cricket games are listed in bold.

List of cricket grounds

First used and last used refer to the season in which the ground hosted its first and last game. If only one game was played at the ground, only the first used date is given.
Team refers to the

See also
List of Test cricket grounds – Full international list
List of stadiums in South Africa

References

External links
Grounds in South Africa – CricketArchive
South Africa Grounds – ESPN Cricinfo
HowSTAT! Grounds List

 

Cricket
South Africa
South Africa
Grounds